American country music artist Patty Loveless has released 16 studio albums, 11 compilation albums, two video albums and 52 singles. Recording a tape of her own music, Loveless signed her first recording contract with MCA Records in 1985. Her self-titled studio album was released in January 1987 and peaked at number 35 on the Billboard Top Country Albums chart. She followed it with her second studio release, If My Heart Had Windows (1988). It peaked at number 33 on the country albums list and spawned her first major country hits: "If My Heart Had Windows" and "A Little Bit in Love". Her third studio album, Honky Tonk Angel (1988), would certify platinum by the Recording Industry Association of America and produced her first number one country hits, "Timber, I'm Falling in Love" and "Chains". Loveless went on to release the studio albums On Down the Line (1990) and Up Against My Heart (1991). Together, both albums produced three top 10 singles including the number three hit "Hurt Me Bad (In a Real Good Way)".

Loveless signed a new contract with Epic Records and released her sixth studio album, Only What I Feel, in April 1993. Reaching number nine on the Top Country Albums chart, number 66 on the Billboard 200, and certifying platinum, it became one of Loveless's most successful albums. The record spawned multiple hit singles, including the number one hit "Blame It on Your Heart" and the top five single "How Can I Help You Say Goodbye". Her platinum-selling seventh album When Fallen Angels Fly (1994) would also reach the top 10 of the country albums chart. All four of its singles reached the top 10 of the Billboard Hot Country Singles & Tracks chart including, "I Try to Think About Elvis" and "You Don't Even Know Who I Am". Her eighth studio release The Trouble with the Truth (1995) produced two more number-one country hits: "You Can Feel Bad" and "Lonely Too Long". The project would also certify platinum in the United States. Loveless's ninth studio record entitled Long Stretch of Lonesome (1997) peaked at number nine on the Top Country Albums chart and produced a top-20 hit featuring George Jones. In 1999, Loveless released her first compilation album entitled Classics, which would certify gold in the United States. Following the release of her 10th studio album, Loveless followed in 2001 with the Bluegrass-flavored Mountain Soul. Critically acclaimed, it was followed by a similarly styled holiday album in 2002. Her 13th studio album, On Your Way Home (2003), peaked at number seven on the country albums chart and produced the top 20 hit, "Lovin' All Night". After the release of her fourteenth studio effort, Loveless signed a contract with Saguaro Road Records. She then issued Sleepless Nights (2008), her fifteenth studio album. Her most recent studio album, Mountain Soul II (2009), reached number 19 on the Top Country Albums chart.

Albums

Studio albums

Compilation albums

Singles

As lead artist

As a featured artist

Other charted songs

Videography

Video albums

Lead music videos

Collaborative and eatured music videos

Other appearances

Notes

References

External links 
 Patty Loveless discography at Discogs

Country music discographies
Discographies of American artists